Forever Reign is the second installment in the Hillsong Chapel praise and worship series by Hillsong Church, which was released in Australia on 22 October 2012 by Hillsong Music Australia. It is an acoustic and devotional collection of Hillsong songs by the Hillsong team. Recorded live in March 2012 at St. Stephen's Anglican Church, "Forever Reign" is the second installment in this organic contemplative expression of praise and worship.  The album reached the Top 50 on the ARIA Albums Chart.

History and recording
The Hillsong Chapel album contains intimate and devotional collection of Hillsong songs by the Hillsong Worship and Hillsong United. The songs are congregational songs, carefully rearranged to be more intimate and suitable for small gatherings. The objective of the Hillsong Chapel project is to help resource smaller congregations with the favourites from Hillsong Live and Hillsong United.

Track listing

References

2010 live albums
2010 video albums
Live video albums
Hillsong Music live albums
Hillsong Music video albums